Steven Phillip Song is a Korean-American architect and real estate investor. Song, as a founding principal of the design firm SCAAA, first came to recognition through collaborations with his mentors, the architects and theoreticians Robert Venturi and Denise Scott Brown. Song is also the CEO of Axle Companies, a family office that invests in real estate and food companies. Song is on the board of directors of the Hammer Museum, the Executive Council of the Clinton Foundation Health Access Initiative, and the Board of Trustees of SCI-Arc (Southern California Institute of Architecture).

Education
Song is a graduate of Carnegie Mellon University, the School of Architecture. He then completed his Master of Architecture degree from the University of Pennsylvania.

Theoretical Writings
In 2007, Song wrote Shifting Paradigms: Renovating the Decorated Shed, together with Sun-Young Park. The article explores and furthers ideas discussed in Venturi and Scott Brown's latest book, Architecture as Signs and Systems: For a Mannerist Time published by Harvard University Press.

According to Song and Park, "The article explores shifting social paradigms in modern times that preclude a clear-cut reading of ‘function.’ New technologies blur the boundaries between civic, public, and private spaces at unprecedented rates – an iPod creates the illusion of privacy in a public space while the internet transforms the ‘private’ home into a virtual Mecca of shopping and information exchange. When patterns of use and delineation of program can no longer be mapped, how should the ‘symbol’ and ‘shelter’ of Architecture engage each other to redefine functionalism? Enveloping such spaces with an electronic ‘sign’ that simply charts these shifting uses, assuming such a charting could be performed cogently, demotes architecture to a mimetic device, which is ultimately unfulfilling in its capacity as an agent for social commentary. While technology has significantly affected our approach to building surfaces, we have yet to study its ramifications on traditional architectural elements and how the two may merge to update our design vocabulary. The curtain wall system is one element explored in our study – generally understood as an amalgamation of the age-old elements of wall and window. However, could it function flexibly both as a component of the shed and its symbol, to negotiate the tenuous private/public boundary? In an era easily seduced by de(con)structive forms and superficial takes on materials and textures, we propose using new communication and engineering technologies to initiate an evolved architectural language – one through which buildings can react to shifting paradigms in contemporary ‘context’ to better perform their dual function of ‘symbol’ and ‘shelter.’"

In July 2007, the article was presented at The 5th International Conference on New Directions in the Humanities held at The American University of Paris. The article, since then, has been revised and appeared at international venues including an American Architectural forum Archinect, and a South-Korean Architectural magazine SPACE.

Song supervised the translation and publication of "Architecture as Signs and Systems: For a Mannerist Time" in South Korea.

In January 2010, an international group of architects, artists, writers, scholars and students convened at Yale University to re-evaluate Venturi and Scott Brown's theories and investigate their cross-disciplinary significance and potential from both historical and contemporary perspectives. The Architecture after Las Vegas symposium revolved around themes and provocations inherent in "Learning from Las Vegas", a text written by the pair that continues to inspire and provoke artists, planners, designers, and architects more than forty years after its first publication.

Following the symposium, Song published Learning from ‘Learning-From’. The review essay recapitulates some of the discussions that happened during and after the symposium, focusing particularly on topics and themes that call for further inquiry.

Song wrote Architecture in the Givenness: Toward the Difficult Whole Again in 2011. The article was featured in two parts by Archinect.

Recognition as an architect

Venturi and Scott Brown wrote in the introduction of the article in SPACE magazine, "In the 1960s and '70s we recommended changes to keep the Modern architecture we love responsive to its times. Forty years later we are happy to read this author's reappraisal of what we said. Steven Song puts aside the debris of misunderstanding that accompanied the first reception of our ideas and sets them back along the tracks we had intended. Then he adapts and expands our thesis to meet conditions that young architects in practice today will face. In doing so, he gives us hope that the newest generation of architects, as they again reformulate Modernism, will maintain and strengthen its good base—what a gift to two old architects!" 

In April, 2009, at the end of their lecture at the Architectural Association in London, Venturi and Scott Brown introduced Song as one of the architects of the new generation who are carrying their ideas forward. Scott Brown listed Song's article in her latest book "Having Words".

Song was quoted in "Re-imagining outdoor learning spaces: Primary capital, co-design and educational transformation," a proposal written by BECTA (the British Educational and Communications Technology Agency) and Futurelab.  as part of a research and development program, which focuses on the use and utility of space for play and learning for children.

Herald Business Korea featured three articles on Song and his apprenticeship with Venturi and Scott Brown in July, 2009.

In their interview with Museo Magazine in 2010, Scott Brown and Venturi said, ”…and Steven Song, whose Shifting Paradigms: Renovating the Decorated Shed takes our ideas into global urbanism and new communication technologies.”

Selected bibliography
 Song, Steven Phillip, “Shifting Paradigms: Renovating the Decorated Shed,” SPACE, No.
496, March 2009, pp. 117–129 (modified from article previously published online w/ same title
at Archinect, May 15, 2008)
Hartman, Pat, "Venturi, Scott Brown and the Future of Architecture," Architectural Graphics Standards, June 18, 2008;
Lee, Y.R., “Architect of the New Generation, Steven Song, to create a think tank of
Architecture,” Herald Business, July 14, 2009; (http://www.heraldbiz.com/SITE/data/html_dir/2009/07/14/200907140668.asp)
Lee, Y.R., “Architecture without consideration for people is a building without life,” Herald
Business, July 14, 2009;
(http://www.heraldbiz.com/SITE/data/html_dir/2009/07/14/200907140634.asp)

References

1981 births
American architects
American architecture writers
American male non-fiction writers
South Korean architects
Carnegie Mellon University College of Fine Arts alumni
Living people
American people of Korean descent
Writers from New York (state)